The 2008 CONCACAF Women's U-20 Championship was the 4th edition of the CONCACAF Women's U-20 Championship, the biennial international youth football championship organised by CONCACAF for the women's under-20 national teams of the North, Central American and Caribbean region. The top three sides also earned qualification to the 2008 FIFA U-20 Women's World Cup. 

The tournament was held from June 17 to June 28, 2008. It featured eight teams and was played entirely at the Estadio Cuauhtémoc in Puebla City, Mexico. The tournament was won by Canada, who defeated the United States in the final by a score of 1–0. Mexico secured the final qualification spot by defeating Costa Rica in the third-place match.

Draw 
The draw for the tournament was held on May 6, 2008, at the CONCACAF Offices of the General Secretariat in New York City. The eight teams which entered the group stage were drawn into two groups of four teams. The hosts, Mexico, were drawn into Group A along with Cuba, Trinidad and Tobago, and the United States, while Canada, Costa Rica, Jamaica, and Nicaragua were drawn into Group B. The schedule was announced on May 14, 2008.

Squads

Group stage

Group A

Group B

Knockout stage

Semi-finals

3rd Place

Final

Winners

Goalscorers

References

External links 
CONCACAF Mexico 2008 Under-20 Women's Championship Recap
CONCACAF Official Website
CONCACAF Under 20 Women's Qualifying Tournament 2007/08 at RSSSF

CONCACAF Women's U-20 Championship
2008 CONCACAF Women's U-20 Championship
Women's
International women's association football competitions hosted by Mexico
CON
2008 in youth association football